Club de Fútbol Pachuca Femenil is a Mexican women's football club based in Pachuca, Hidalgo, Mexico. The club has been the female section of CF Pachuca since 2017. The team currently plays in the Liga MX Femenil.

Personnel

Management

Coaching staff

Players

Current squad
As of 21 December 2022

References

Liga MX Femenil teams
Association football clubs established in 2017
Women's association football clubs in Mexico
C.F. Pachuca
C.F. Pachuca (women)
2017 establishments in Mexico